The designation of the oldest church in the United States requires careful use of definitions, and must be divided into two parts, the oldest in the sense of oldest surviving building, and the oldest in the sense of oldest Christian church congregation.  There is a distinction between old church buildings that have been in continuous use as churches, and those that have been converted to other purposes; and between buildings that have been in continuous use as churches and those that were shuttered for many decades.

In terms of congregations, they are distinguished between early established congregations that have been in continuous existence (sometimes through great theological changes), and early congregations that ceased to exist.  Some of these churches are located in areas that were part of the original Thirteen Colonies that made up the United States in 1776. Others were built in states that were later annexed, such as Louisiana and New Mexico. Sites on the list are generally from the First Period of American architecture or earlier.

To be listed here a site must:
be the oldest church in a state, territory, large city (top 50), or oldest of its type (denomination, architectural, etc.);
be freestanding (not a ruin or mound, as there are separate lists for those); and/or
be the oldest congregation of its type (denomination).

Oldest church buildings

LaMarsh Baptist church Mapleton, Il was established in 1838 in a barn until the church was built later that year (or following year). The church added a basement in the 1950s, and added the new church in 1997 (keeping the old church in its location). As of October 27, 2021, they will celebrate their 183rd Anniversary, being the 6th oldest church in Illinois, 49th oldest in the United States and the 224th oldest in the world.

Shield Chapel Methodist Church was established and built in Canton, Illinois, in 1840 and still exists today, 181 years later.

Wesley United Methodist Church was established and built in Canton, IL in 1895. It is still in operation today both in its oldest church and 2nd building across the street.

Oldest continuous church congregations

LaMarsh Baptist church Mapleton, Il was established in 1838 in a barn until the church was built later that year (or following year). The church added a basement in the 1950s, and added the new church in 1997 (keeping the old church in its location). In October 2021 they celebrated their 183rd Anniversary, being the 6th oldest church in Illinois, 49th oldest in the United States and the 224th oldest in the world.

Shield Chapel Methodist Church was established and built in Canton, Illinois, in 1840 and still exists today, 181 years later.

Wesley United Methodist Church was established and built in Canton, IL in 1895. It is still in operation today both in its oldest church and second building across the street.

By state

Alabama
Indian Springs Baptist Church, possibly the oldest surviving church building. Circa 1825.
Cathedral Basilica of the Immaculate Conception, Mobile, congregation established in 1703, took current name in 1781, current building completed in 1850 (Roman Catholic)
Mt. Calvary Presbyterian Church, Clay, AL.  Founded in 1806.
Flint River Primitive Baptist Church, founded in 1808 (Baptist)
Hurricane Baptist Church, Gilbertown, AL, founded in 1816 (Baptist)
Canaan Baptist Church, Bessemer, was founded in 1818 (Southern Baptist).
Round Island Baptist Church (Athens, Limestone County) was founded in 1817.
Old Salem Baptist Church, Monroe County was founded in Nov. 1817 and is still an active church.

Alaska
Church of the Holy Ascension, oldest church building, built in 1826 (Eastern Orthodox)
St. Michael's Cathedral (Sitka, Alaska) (Eastern Orthodox)
Russian Orthodox Church in Kodiak Alaska, oldest congregation, founded in 1794 (Eastern Orthodox)
Sitka Lutheran Church, oldest Protestant church congregation, founded in 1839 (Lutheran)

Arkansas
Rockport First United Methodist Church, Rockport (near Malvern), oldest continually operating congregation in the state, organized in 1816
Smyrna Church, Searcy, oldest church building in the state, built in 1856 (Methodist)

Arizona
Mission San Xavier del Bac, oldest church building, built 1780–1797 (Roman Catholic)
St. Paul's Episcopal Church (Tombstone, Arizona), oldest Protestant church, built in 1882 (Episcopal)

California
Mission San Diego de Alcalá, oldest congregation, founded in 1769 (Roman Catholic)
Basilica of San Carlos Borromeo de Carmelo Mission (Carmel Mission), founded by Fr. Junipero Serra in 1770, making it the second of the 21 California missions.
Mission San Juan Capistrano, built in 1782 (Roman Catholic)
First Baptist Church, San Francisco, founded in 1849, sharing oldest Protestant church congregation with Old First Presbyterian Church (Baptist)
Old First Presbyterian Church, San Francisco, sharing oldest Protestant church congregation with First Baptist Church, founded in 1849 (Presbyterian)
Emmanuel Church in Coloma, oldest Protestant church building, built in 1855 (Methodist/Episcopal)
Trinity+St. Peter's Church (Episcopal), San Francisco, oldest Episcopal church congregation west of the Mississippi, founded 1849 as Trinity Church (Episcopal)
St. John's Church in Sacramento, Built in 1867 (Evangelical Lutheran)

Colorado
Our Lady of Guadalupe Catholic Church in Antonito, oldest church building and congregation, built in 1857 (Roman Catholic)
St. James Methodist Church in Central City, oldest Protestant church in Colorado still used as a church, oldest Protestant congregation (1859) and oldest Protestant church in the state (1871) (Methodist)

Connecticut
Abington Congregational Church, oldest church building, built in 1751 (Congregational/United Church of Christ)
First Church of Windsor, oldest church congregation, founded in 1633 (Congregational/United Church of Christ)
First Church of Christ and the Ancient Burying Ground, Founded 1632 in Charlestown, Massachusetts. (Congregational/United Church of Christ)
Lakeville Methodist Church, oldest standing Methodist church in New England.
First Church of Christ, oldest Church building in Glastonbury, founded 1693

Delaware
Holy Trinity Church (Old Swedes), oldest church building in Delaware, built in 1698 (Lutheran/Episcopal)
Old First Presbyterian Church (Wilmington, Delaware), first Presbyterian church established in Wilmington, constructed 1746 (Presbyterian)
Barratt's Chapel, oldest surviving church building in the United States built by and for Methodists (built in 1780), known as the "Cradle of Methodism" in America.
Chester-Bethel Church, established 1780, oldest Methodist congregation which has continuously gathered in the state of DE.

Florida

Cathedral Basilica of St. Augustine. Parish established September 8, 1565. Present church cornerstone laid in 1793, dedicated in 1797. Elevated to Cathedral when Diocese of St. Augustine was created in 1870.  Became Basilica in 1976.
Trinity Episcopal Church in St. Augustine is Florida's second oldest Episcopal Church. It opened its doors in 1831. Trinity remains on its original site, and with its original steeple that was completed in 1837.
Memorial United Methodist Church (Fernandina Beach, Florida) Oldest continuous Methodist church in Florida. Established in 1822 by Elijah Sinclair. First building was on Broome and 6th Street in historic downtown Fernandina Beach. The congregation moved to larger, and their current, building in the 1920s at 601 Centre Street. Sister church to Trinity United Methodist Church.
Old Christ Church (Pensacola, Florida). Oldest church in Florida on its original foundation, incorporated by an act of the Territorial Legislature in 1829, built in 1832.  The building was desecrated during the American Civil War, restored, deconsecrated in the past 20 years and is now owned and operated by The Old Christ Church Foundation and the University of West Florida Historical Trust. The congregation is now located in [new] Christ Church, 18 West Wright Street, Pensacola, built in 1905 (Episcopal).
Bethel Baptist Church (Lakeland, Florida) Bethel church congregation first met on this site in 1851 and has met continually since then. Performed baptisms in “Indian Pond” until the 1940s. A Sanctuary was Built in 1928. (Southern Baptist)
Mount Beasor Primitive Baptist Church (Sopchoppy, Florida) established in 1853 (Baptist).
St. John's Episcopal Church (Tallahassee, Florida). St. John's is the mother church of the Diocese of Florida. It was founded as a mission parish in 1829, and the church's first building was erected in 1837. The Diocese was organized at St. John's in 1838 and Francis Huger Rutledge, who became rector of St. John's in 1845, was consecrated the first Bishop of Florida in 1851. The original church burned in 1879; a new church was built on the same site and consecrated in 1888, and it is still the parish's principal place of worship.
Middleburg United Methodist Church (3925 Main Street, Middleburg, FL 32068), oldest Methodist Meeting House in the State of Florida. Historical Marker states it was founded on or before July 27, 1828, by Isaac Boring, with the first church erected in 1847. It was built mostly by the hands of slaves, who retained a pew in the back of the church. Services are still conducted every Sunday, and, on special occasions. Its sermons and musical sounds, and beauty, resonates from the wood planks, hand cut, and, pews hand crafted with peg and board design, and, the intricate chandeliers providing light from above. This church congregation celebrated its 192nd year in 2015, which dates it back to 1823...to the founding congregants. Originally, Methodist Circuit Riders would hold meetings in homes, until the original church was erected (1847). The church bell tolled for the first time on February 29, 1860, for the funeral of the son of George Branning, who had the bell shipped from where it was cast in New York.
Trinity Episcopal Cathedral, Miami, the cathedral of the Episcopal Diocese of Southeast Florida, is the oldest church in the original city limits of Miami.

Georgia
Christ Church (Episcopal) is the Mother Church of Georgia. It was founded in 1733 and assigned its land plot by General James Oglethorpe.
Saint Paul’s Church (Episcopal) was built in 1751 at Fort Augusta. Located on the corner of 6th and Reynolds Streets and is the oldest congregation in Augusta. 
Jerusalem Lutheran Church, oldest church building in Georgia, built in 1769 (Lutheran)
 First African Baptist Church (Savannah, Georgia), claims continuous ties with Silver Bluff Baptist Church congregation as oldest black Baptist congregation, 1774-1775 (Baptist)
 Springfield Baptist Church (Augusta, Georgia) also has continuous congregational ties to Silver Bluff Baptist Church (Baptist)
Antioch Christian Church (Watkinsville, Georgia).  The oldest Disciples of Christ congregation in Georgia, established in 1806.

Guam
 Dulce Nombre de Maria Cathedral Basilica (Roman Catholic) is a structure located on the site where the first Catholic church in the United States territory of Guam was constructed in 1669. The current building was erected in 1959, after the destruction of the former church in WWII.

Hawaii
Mokuaikaua Church, oldest church congregation and building, founded in 1820, built in 1837 (Congregational)
Kawaiahao Church, oldest church congregation, founded in 1820, current structure dedicated in 1842 (Congregational)

Idaho
Christ Chapel (Boise, Idaho), oldest Protestant church, built in 1866 (Episcopal)
Old Mission, oldest church building in Idaho, built in 1848 (Roman Catholic)

Illinois

Church of the Holy Family (Cahokia), oldest church building, built in 1799 (Roman Catholic)
Flat Creek Missionary Baptist Church (East Carondelet), Established 1809. Due to its location (Flat Creek Bottom), the people in the area began referring to the church as Flat Creek Baptist Church, although the members officially named the church, "The Missionary Baptist Church of East Carondelet".
Shiloh United Methodist Church (Shiloh, Illinois) established 1807.  Current building same location 1825.
Mulkeytown Christian Church, established 1818, is the oldest Independent Christian Church.  It is now a part of the fellowship of Christian Churches and Churches of Christ or the "Independent Christian Church" a group which separated from the Disciples of Christ beginning in 1924. The oldest congregation still affiliated with the Christian Church (Disciples of Christ) is Barney's Priarie in Mt. Carmel, established 1816.
Regular/Lighthouse Baptist Church (Griggsville) 1834
LaMarsh Baptist church Mapleton, Il  was established in 1838 in a barn until the church was built later that year (or following year). The church added a basement in the 1950s, and added the new church in 1997 (keeping the old church in its location).  As of October 27, 2021, they will celebrated their 183rd Anniversary being the 6th oldest church in Illinois, 49th oldest in the United States and the 224th oldest in the world.  They still have a weekly service being held every Sunday Morning 10:30 am, Sunday Night at 6pm and Wednesday night at 7pm. They also have additional events such as prayer meetings (Sunday night at 5:30 PM), soul winning, VBS, and other activities. 
Shield Chapel Methodist Church was established and built in Canton, Illinois, in 1840 and still exists today,  years later.
First Baptist Church of Elizabethtown, oldest Baptist church congregation in Illinois, possibly oldest Protestant church, founded in 1842 (Baptist)
 Wesley United Methodist Church was established and built in Canton, IL in 1895. It is still in operation today both in its oldest church and 2nd building across the street.

Indiana
Old Cathedral Complex, oldest congregation, founded in 1749 (Roman Catholic)
 Stony Point Christian Church, Charlestown, oldest Protestant congregation in Indiana, constituted in 1789
Little Cedar Grove Baptist Church, oldest church building, built in 1812 (Baptist)
Blue River Friends Hicksite Meeting House and Cemetery, oldest meeting house, built in 1815 (Quaker)

Iowa
St. Raphael's Cathedral (Dubuque, Iowa), oldest church congregation in Iowa, founded in 1833 (Roman Catholic)
St. Anthony's Catholic Church (Davenport, Iowa), oldest church building, built in 1838 (Roman Catholic)

Kansas
White Church Christian Church (Disciples of Christ), oldest continuous church congregation, founded in 1832
Beecher Bible and Rifle Church, Wabaunsee, Kansas, built in 1862, possibly oldest church building

Kentucky
Cane Ridge Meeting House, Possibly the oldest church building, built in 1791 (Presbyterian and Disciples of Christ)
First Baptist Church of Somerset in Pulaksi County. Built and established in 1799.
Hopeful Lutheran Church, in Boone County, organized in 1806 by a group of colonists from Virginia
Onton United Methodist Church, Webster County, Kentucky, established 1820

Louisiana
St. Gabriel Catholic Church, oldest church building in the Mississippi River Valley, completed in 1772. (Roman Catholic)
St. Louis Cathedral, New Orleans, oldest congregation in Louisiana, founded in 1718, current building built in 1793. (Roman Catholic)
St. Martin of Tours Catholic Church (St. Martinville, Louisiana), oldest congregation in the Diocese of Lafayette, established in 1765, current building completed in 1844. (Roman Catholic)
Christ Church Cathedral, New Orleans, oldest Protestant church congregation in Louisiana, founded in 1818, current building completed in 1886. (Episcopal)

Maine
First Congregational Church and Parsonage (Kittery, Maine), possibly the oldest church building in Maine, built in 1703 (Congregational).
First Parish Congregational Church of York, Maine. Oldest church congregation, (Congregational/United Church of Christ) founded before 1672, organized in the Congregational tradition by Shubael Dummer.

Maryland
Christ Church Parish Kent Island, 1631, oldest continuously-worshipping congregation in Maryland
Old Trinity Church, Maryland, 1675, Episcopal, building in continuous use; as such, oldest in the US.
Third Haven Meeting House, oldest Quaker building in the US, built in 1682
St. Anne's Church (Annapolis, Maryland), founded in 1692
Rehoboth Presbyterian Church (Somerset County, MD), the oldest Presbyterian Church in continuous use (USA), built in 1706
St. Francis Xavier Church and Newtown Manor House Historic District, congregation originated from a Jesuit mission started in 1640, surviving building dates to 1731
Sacred Heart Church (Bowie, Maryland)  Built 1741
Salem Reformed Church, in Hagerstown, Maryland, Washington County, Maryland (1747)
St. Paul's Church, in Clear Spring, Maryland, Washington County (1747)
Evangelical Lutheran Church (Frederick, Maryland) (1762)
St. John's Episcopal Church, 1767, is located in the Broad Creek Historic District.
All Saints' Church (Sunderland, Maryland)] (1692), surviving building dates to 1777
Old Otterbein, oldest church edifice in continuous use in the city of Baltimore (built 1785–1786) and the mother church of the United Brethren in Christ.
St. James Episcopal Church (Baltimore, Maryland) at Lafayette Square, oldest African American congregation south of the Mason–Dixon line (1824)

Massachusetts
First Church in Plymouth, oldest congregation founded 1620 (building 1899), (Puritan, Congregational, now Unitarian Universalist)
First Parish Church in Dorchester, organized March 20, 1630 (originally Puritan Congregational, now Unitarian Universalist)
First Church in Boston, organized August 27, 1630; Church Covenant signed July 30, 1630. (Originally Puritan Congregational, now Unitarian Universalist)
First Congregational Church of Marshfield, gathered in 1632 (same building since 1838) (Congregational) [1]
First Congregational Church, First Church in Roxbury, founded/built in 1632 (majorly rebuilt 4 times, but constantly in use) (Congregational, now Unitarian Universalist. Serves as headquarters for community outreach program "UU Urban Ministry"). Unitarian Universalist Urban Ministry - Boston, MA
Newman Congregational Church. Founded in 1643 by the Rev. Samuel Newman in what was then Rehoboth, Massachusetts. (Now located in East Providence, Rhode Island.)
First Parish Congregational Church aka Stone Church by the Lake, founded in 1644, located in Wakefield.  Has had 5 different meeting houses but has been continually in use.
First Baptist Church in Swansea, oldest Baptist congregation in MA, founded in 1663 (Baptist)
First Parish in Cambridge, founded on February 1, 1636, at the First Church (Evangelical, now Unitarian Universalist)
First Parish Church (Waltham, Massachusetts), gathered in 1696 (Unitarian Universalist)
St. Michael's Church (Marblehead, Massachusetts). Oldest Episcopal Church in New England on its original foundation, built 1714, and still used daily year-round.  A National Historic Landmark.
Old North Church, Official name: Christ Church in the City of Boston. Oldest standing church building in Boston, built 1723 (Episcopal) a National Historic Landmark significant for its role in the American Revolution.
Old Ship Church, built in 1681, is one of the oldest buildings in America.  The congregation was gathered in 1635.  It was originally a Puritan, Congregationalist congregation, but is now affiliated with the Unitarian Universalists.
First Parish Church in Duxbury, founded in 1632 by Elder William Brewster as a Christian Separatist Church with early members coming from the First Parish Church in Plymouth.

Michigan
 La Mission Ste. Marie, Sault Sainte Marie, First Catholic congregation in the state, founded by Jacques Marquette in 1668. There have been 5 Catholic churches on this site since 1668. In 2018 St. Mary's parish celebrates its 350th anniversary.
 Ste. Anne de Detroit Catholic Church, oldest congregation (Roman Catholic) founded 2 days after Antoine de la Mothe Cadillac founded Detroit in 1701.
 Mission Church, Mackinac Island, oldest church building, built 1829-30 (Congregational)
 Central United Methodist Church, Detroit, First Methodist and First Protestant congregation. Established 1810.  Their first church building was built in 1818.  In 2010 they celebrated their 200th Anniversary.
 Cathedral Church of St. Paul (Detroit). Oldest Episcopal congregation in Michigan (1824).

Minnesota
Saint Peter's Church (Mendota, Minnesota), oldest church in continuous use in Minnesota, built in 1853 (Roman Catholic)
First Presbyterian Church (Stillwater, Minnesota), oldest Protestant congregation, founded December 8, 1849.

Missouri
In 1764, when Pierre Laclède and Auguste Chouteau established the city of St. Louis, they dedicated a plot of land west of Laclède's home for the purposes of the Catholic Church. The earliest Catholic records suggest that a tent was used by an itinerant priest in 1766, but by 1770 a small log house was built on the site. This building, consecrated by the Reverend Pierre Gibault, on June 24, 1770, was expanded in 1776 to include a log church. The first bishop of the Diocese of St. Louis, Joseph Rosati, began construction of a new cathedral, now the Basilica of St. Louis, King of France. The cornerstone of the church was laid by Rosati during a ceremony on August 1, 1831. It is the oldest cathedral west of the Mississippi River. 
In 1791 St. Charles Borromeo was founded as a log cabin on the banks of the Missouri River and has been rebuilt 3 times. St. Charles Borromeo is also the namesake of St. Charles. (Roman Catholic)
In 1799, the first Protestant sermon and baptism by immersion west of the Mississippi River was performed in Randol Creek near Dutchtown.
In 1806, the Bethel (Baptist) Church was formed in Cape Girardeau County, now Jackson. Fee Fee Baptist Church in Bridgeton, oldest Protestant church congregation, founded in 1807 (Baptist)
Around 1816, settlers started meeting together in homes for worship on the Missouri River near the present village of Rocheport 12 years after Lewis and Clark camped there in 1804. In 1837, they were chartered as the Rocheport Christian Church. The present building, built in 1847, has been in continuous use since that time. The church building and congregation have survived Missouri River floods and infestations of termites.  The congregation continues with weekly Sunday School and Holy Communion. Sunday worship is held on the first Sunday of each month. A Bluegrass Worship service is held at 5 p.m. on the First Saturday night each month.  In 2015, the church was named the Missouri Rural Church of the year. (Disciples of Christ)
St. Ferdinand's Shrine, oldest church building, built in 1821 (Roman Catholic)
In 1832, The Presbyterian Church in Potosi, Missouri, the oldest Presbyterian church west of the Mississippi River to be in continuous service was organized. It is also the oldest Presbyterian church still standing west of the Mississippi River. (Presbyterian)
Christ Church Cathedral, St Louis, is the oldest Episcopal Church congregation in Missouri, founded in 1819 (Episcopalian)

Mississippi
Woodville Baptist Church, oldest church building, built in 1809 (Baptist)
Jersey Settlers, Adams County, oldest Protestant congregation, 1772, Reverend Samuel Swayze
Salem Baptist Church, Jefferson County, oldest Baptist church congregation, 1791

Montana

St. Mary's Mission, oldest church congregation, founded in 1841 (Roman Catholic)
First Baptist Church in Stevensville, possibly oldest Protestant church building, built in 1882 (Baptist)
Melville Lutheran Church, oldest Lutheran congregation, founded in 1885, church building still in use (Lutheran)
Dry Creek Bible, Belgrade, oldest continually active Protestant church, established November 1884

Nebraska
First Presbyterian Church of Bellevue, oldest church building, built in 1856 (Presbyterian)
Salem Evangelical Lutheran Church of Fontanelle, oldest continuous Lutheran church in the US west of the Mississippi River, built in 1860 (Lutheran–ELCA)

Nevada
First Presbyterian Church of Carson City, oldest church building, built in 1864 (Presbyterian)

New Hampshire
First Parish Church in Dover, oldest congregation founded in 1632 (Congregational/United Church of Christ)
 Newington Meeting House is the oldest church building in New Hampshire (1717, Congregational).

New Jersey
St. Mary's Episcopal Church, oldest church building, built in 1703 (Episcopal)
Old Bergen Church, oldest church congregation, founded in 1660 (Reformed)

New Mexico
San Miguel Mission, oldest church building, built in 1610 (Roman Catholic)
San Juan de los Caballeros/San Juan Bautista, Established 1598, second oldest foundation in the United States (Roman Catholic)
First Presbyterian Church in Santa Fe, founded in 1867, oldest Protestant Church congregation in New Mexico (Presbyterian)

New York
Marble Collegiate Church, oldest congregation founded in 1628 (building 1851) (Reformed)
Reformed Protestant Dutch Church of the Town of Flatbush founded in 1654 (Reformed) 
Old Dutch Church of Sleepy Hollow, oldest church building, built in 1685 (Reformed)
 Christ Church of Clarkson (formerly Clarkson Community Church), Monroe County, New York, founded in 1816, built in 1825 (Baptist)
Old Dutch Church (Kingston, New York), one of the oldest continuously existing congregations in the country, since 1659

North Carolina
St. James Parish (Wilmington, North Carolina), established in November 1729 (Episcopal)
St. Thomas Episcopal Church (Bath, North Carolina), oldest church building, built in 1734 (Episcopal)
Cane Creek Friends Church was established in 1751 near Snow Camp, NC.
Laurel Hill Presbyterian Church (Laurel Hill, North Carolina), established 1797 (Presbyterian). 
Faith Presbyterian Church (Laurinburg, North Carolina) establishment unknown, first mentioned in 1802. (Presbyterian)
Bethabara Moravian Church (Winston-Salem, NC) established November 17, 1753 (Moravian), built in 1788
Rockfish Presbyterian Church, (Wallace, North Carolina) 1756
Philadelphia Evangelical Lutheran Church (Gaston County—Dallas, NC) established 1767.
Brook's Chapel Church (Polksville, North Carolina), established in 1869 (Methodist)
Wheat Swamp Christian Church (Disciples of Christ), Kinston, Established 1760.
St. Patrick Catholic Church (Fayetteville, NC), established-parish August 6, 1821, church August 11, 1821.

North Dakota
First Presbyterian Church of Bismarck, oldest congregation, founded in 1873 (Presbyterian)
Glencoe Presbyterian Church, oldest church building used by original congregation, built in 1885 (Presbyterian)
 First Congregation, Assumption Catholic Church in Pembina, 1818

Ohio
Covenant-First Presbyterian Church, (Cincinnati, Ohio), organized October 16, 1790, is the oldest Presbyterian congregation west of the Allegheny Mountains.
First Congregational Church of Hudson, founded in 1802
Holy Trinity Lutheran Church, North Canton Ohio Founded in 1806. Is one of the oldest congregations in the state of Ohio that is still meeting today. The church was also mentioned in an exhibit at the McKinley Presidential Museum in North Canton, Ohio as one of the oldest churches in the state.
Mt Carmel Baptist Church (Kenwood, OH) was founded in Sycamore Twp., in Hamilton County on July 20, 1822 with twenty-five members. The original building was located at the corner of Kugler Mill and Kenwood Rd. The Sycamore Township Cemetery is the old Mt. Carmel Baptist Church cemetery that sat next to the original church.  The congregation still meets today at 8645 Kenwood Rd. in Sycamore Twp.
 Home Chapel, dedicated in 1870 It is the first permanent chapel ever constructed by the U.S. Government at the National Home for the Disabled Volunteer Soldier, Dayton, Ohio.
 The Church in Aurora, The original church was Congregational, formed in 1809, shortly after Aurora was founded.
Beaver United Church of Christ, located in Beavercreek, Ohio was founded in 1809 as a German Reformed Church, and is still meeting today.
West Union Presbyterian Church, oldest church building still in use as a church, built in 1810 (Presbyterian)
First Lutheran Church in Canton, Ohio was built in 1810 and still operates today.  It is considered "The Cradle of Lutheranism in Ohio."
First Church of the Resurrection founded in 1810 and was built in 1862 and still in use today (Non-Denominational)
Brunswick United Methodist Church (Brunswick, OH), founded in 1817 and is the oldest church in Medina County and the second oldest in the Western Reserve. It is still in use today and was expanded in 2002. 
St. Paul's Episcopal Church, South Bass Island, oldest wooden church building still in use as a church, built in 1865 (Episcopal)
St. Theodosius Russian Orthodox Cathedral, first Orthodox parish in Cleveland (organized in 1896)
Hopewell Methodist Church in Rush Run, Ohio, oldest Methodist Church in Ohio (1803), site of the first Methodist sermon preached in the Northwest Territory (1787) and the first Methodist ordination in Ohio (1803)
Nast Trinity United Methodist Church (Cincinnati, Ohio), built in 1881, it is the home of the first German Methodist church to be established anywhere in the world.
Holy Assumption Orthodox Church in Marblehead, Ohio. Oldest Orthodox church building in Ohio, built in 1906.
Cortland Christian Church, Disciples of Christ was founded in 1828 with the current building built in 1853.  It is the second-oldest DoC church in Ohio and the 4th oldest DoC congregation in the U.S.

Oklahoma
Wheelock Church, oldest church building, built in 1846 (Presbyterian)
Ottawa Indian Baptist Church founded in March 1840, built in Oklahoma in March 1860

Oregon
St. Paul Roman Catholic Church (St. Paul, Oregon), oldest church building, built in 1846 (Roman Catholic)
Oregon City United Methodist Church, oldest Protestant church, founded in 1844 (Methodist)

Pennsylvania
 Christ Church, Philadelphia, "The Nation's Church", founded 1695, a place of worship for the Founding Fathers and final resting place of five signers of the Declaration of Independence including Benjamin Franklin. 
 Old Norriton Presbyterian Church, founded in 1678 as a Dutch Reformed Church. The existing church building was built in 1698.
 Germantown Mennonite Meeting House, Germantown Mennonite Church in Germantown, PA (1683).
Merion Friends Meeting House, oldest church building in Pennsylvania (1695), Merion Station (Quaker).
Brandywine Baptist Church, 2nd oldest Baptist Church in Pennsylvania (1692), Chadds Ford (Baptist).
 St. Thomas, Whitemarsh, founded in 1698. One of the 25 oldest churches in the US. Present church is the fourth building on the site.(Episcopal)
St. Martin's Church, Marcus Hook, Pennsylvania (1699)
Abington Friends Meeting House, Jenkintown, Pennsylvania (1699)
New Hanover Lutheran Church near Gilbertsville, Pennsylvania, Founded about 1700.
 St. Peter's in the Great Valley, founded as an Anglican church about 1700. Construction of existing building started in 1744. Changed from Anglican to Episcopalian after the Revolutionary War.
Gloria Dei (Old Swedes' Church), second oldest church building, built in 1700 (Lutheran/Episcopal)
Upper Octorara Presbyterian Church, founded in 1720 and built by Arthur Park and his sons as well as other kinsmen near present-day Parkesburg. Present church has been having worship and service for 300 years, and has been serving the purpose of God in our generation.
Middle Octorara Presbyterian Church, founded in 1727 by Arthur Park and other kinsmen. Its members built and worshipped in a log structure located in what is now our Old Cemetery. The present church building was constructed in about 1800 with bell towers and narthex being added in 1914. In 1953, construction began on a new educational building to replace the chapel previously used for Sunday School classes. This new building was expanded and modified over the years with a complete renovation taking place in 1999–2000.
Old St. Joseph's Church, oldest Roman Catholic congregation in Pennsylvania (1733)
Beulah Presbyterian Church 2500 McCrady Road, Pittsburgh PA 15235, Since 1784
St. George's United Methodist Church (Philadelphia), built in 1769, America's first and oldest continuously used Methodist church in the world.
African Episcopal Church of St. Thomas, founded 1792, oldest black Episcopal congregation in the United States (Episcopal)
Mother Bethel AME Church, oldest African Methodist Episcopal congregation, founded 1794 (African Methodist Episcopal)
Old Trinity Church, one of the oldest churches in Philadelphia, erected 1711 (Episcopal)
Christ Lutheran Church (York), built in 1743 (Lutheran).
Enon Tabernacle Baptist Church (Philadelphia) – Founded in 1876 as a small group of church goers and built on land in Germantown on 230 W. Coulter Street off of Wayne Avenue.
Central Moravian Church (Bethlehem) Chapel built in 1751 and the Sanctuary, completed in 1806.

Puerto Rico

Cathedral of San Juan Bautista, oldest church building, built in 1521 (Roman Catholic)
San Jose Church, Iglesia de San Jose, was constructed in the 1530s by Dominican friars for use by their Saint Thomas Aquinas monastery. The church is located in Old San Juan. (Roman Catholic)
Holy Trinity Anglican Church in Ponce, oldest Protestant church, and first Anglican church in Latin America, founded in 1872 (Anglican)

Rhode Island
First Baptist Church in America, oldest congregation in RI, founded in 1638 (building 1775) (Baptist).
Newman Congregational Church, United Church of Christ, founded in 1643 (current building 1810) (United Church of Christ)
Six Principle Baptist Church, one of the oldest Baptist church buildings in the U.S., built in 1703, (Baptist)
Trinity Church, Newport, oldest Anglican congregation in RI, founded in 1698 (building 1726) (Episcopal).
Great Friends Meeting House, oldest church building in RI, built in 1699 (Quaker).
Old Narragansett Church, Wickford, oldest Episcopal church building in New England (1707).
Portsmouth Friends Meeting House, Portsmouth, building dates from the 1690s.
First Congregational Church, Bristol Bristol first and founding church since 1680.
Kingston Congregational Church, Kingston founded in 1695, history on KingCongChurch.org (current building 1820 -United Church of Christ)

South Carolina
St. Philip's Episcopal Church (Charleston, South Carolina), oldest Episcopal congregation south of Virginia, founded 1681 (Anglican)
First Baptist Church (Charleston, South Carolina), oldest Baptist congregation in the South, founded in 1682 (Baptist)
Presbyterian Church on Edisto - 1685
Old St. Andrew's Parish Church, Charleston, South Carolina, oldest church building in the state, built in 1706 (Anglican)
Parish Church of St. Helena, Beaufort, South Carolina, founded 1712, built 1724 (Anglican)
Zion Lutheran Church (Lexington County, South Carolina), oldest church congregation in interior S. C. above the fall line, founded 1745.
Silver Bluff Baptist Church, oldest black Baptist congregation in the nation, founded 1774-1775 (Baptist)
St. James Church (Goose Creek, South Carolina), built in 1719 (Anglican)
Friendship Baptist Church (Pauline, South Carolina) Founded in 1765. Oldest Baptist church in the Upstate.
Congaree Baptist Church (Gadsden, South Carolina) Founded in 1765. Present church building constructed around 1810.
St. Mary's Roman Catholic Church (Charleston, South Carolina) Founded in 1789 as the first Roman Catholic Church in the Carolinas and Georgia.
 Millway Baptist Church (Bradley, South Carolina), founded in 1811 (Baptist)
First Baptist Church (Sumter, South Carolina) Church building built in 1820.

South Dakota
Renner Lutheran Church, oldest operating church building, built in 1878 (Lutheran)

Tennessee
Sinking Creek Baptist Church, oldest church building, oldest congregation and building, founded in 1772 (Baptist)
Beech Cumberland Presbyterian Church, the oldest church in Middle Tennessee, Founded in 1798 by Thomas Craighead.  The Cumberland Presbyterian Church, founded in 1810, constituted its first Synod there on October 5. 1813.
Suggs Creek Cumberland Presbyterian, First Confession of Faith of the Cumberland Presbyterian Church was adopted in 1814, Suggs Creek church founded in 1800 (Cumberland Presbyterian)
Double Springs Baptist Church (Sullivan County), Founded in 1786 by Jonathan Mulkey
First Presbyterian Church (Greeneville, Tennessee), oldest congregation in Greene County, founded in 1780 by Rev. Samuel Doak
St. John's Cathedral (Knoxville, Tennessee) Established in 1826 (35 years after the founding of Knoxville). In May 1844, with 25 communicants, St. John's became the first mission from Eastern Tennessee to be admitted to the Diocese of Tennessee.

Texas
Cathedral of San Fernando, possibly oldest church building, built 1738-1750 (Roman Catholic)
McMahan Chapel in St. Augustine, the oldest Protestant church congregation in Texas, founded in 1833 (Methodist)
Old Pilgrim Two Seed-in-the-Spirit Church, oldest Baptist Church in Texas, founded in 1834 (Baptist)
San Felipe United Methodist Church, the oldest Protestant church building in Texas, built in 1838 (Methodist)
Ysleta Mission, possibly the oldest continuous congregation, founded in 1680 (Roman Catholic)
Our Lady of Loreto Chapel, at the Presidio La Bahia, Goliad, founded in 1779 (Roman Catholic)
First Presbyterian Church at San Antonio, the first Protestant church in San Antonio, founded in 1846 (Presbyterian)
First Montgomery Baptist Church in Montgomery, Texas, founded in 1850 (Baptist)
Chinn Chapel United Methodist Church in Copper Canyon, TX, founded in 1877 (Methodist)

United States Virgin Islands
Frederick Lutheran Church, of Charlotte Amalie, St. Thomas, built in 1666. It is the oldest continuous Lutheran church in the western hemisphere (Lutheran - ELCA)
Lord God of Sabaoth Lutheran Church, of Christiansted, St. Croix, began worshipping in 1734 and the building built in 1750 (Lutheran - ELCA)

Utah
Bountiful Tabernacle, oldest Mormon Tabernacle, built in 1857 (Mormon)
Pine Valley Chapel, oldest Mormon meetinghouse in continuous use, built in 1868 (Mormon)
First Congregational Church, Salt Lake City, first non-LDS church in the state, 1865 (Congregational)
St. Mark's Cathedral, Salt Lake City, oldest non-LDS Church building in continual use, built in 1871 (Episcopal)

Vermont
First Congregational Church of Bennington, oldest congregation, founded in 1762 (Congregational)
St. James' Episcopal Church (Arlington, Vermont), oldest Anglican/Episcopal congregation founded in 1764 (Episcopalian)
Rockingham Meeting House, one of the two oldest church buildings, built in 1787 (Congregational)
Thetford Meeting House, Thetford Hill, one of the two oldest church buildings, built in 1787 (Congregational)

Virginia

St. John's Episcopal Church (Hampton, Virginia), oldest English-speaking parish in continuous existence in the United States of America, founded in 1610 (Episcopal)
St. Luke's Church, oldest surviving church building in Virginia, built 1685–1686; this date, however, is controversial. Local oral history dates the building as 1632. National Historic Landmark. (Anglican Circa 1685–1804, Episcopal Circa 1804–1836, Historic Church Museum 1953–present).
St. Peter's Church (New Kent, Virginia), The Episcopal parish was established in 1679, the current brick building was begun in 1701.  Services were first held in the building by 1703.  The "stump" tower was added by 1740 to house a bell and provide a meeting place for the Vestry,  
Bruton Parish Church (Williamsburg, Virginia), established in 1674 by the consolidation of two previous parishes in the Virginia Colony. The church remains an active Episcopal parish. The building was constructed 1711-15 and was designated a National Historic Landmark.
Slash Church or Slash Christian Church (Disciples of Christ), oldest wooden frame church building in Virginia, built in 1729
The Falls Church,  The Episcopal parish was established in 1732 and the brick meeting house preserved on site dates to 1769
Augusta Stone Church, (Presbyterian), oldest Presbyterian church in Virginia.  The wood meeting house was built in 1740, and was replaced with the current stone church (still in use) in 1749.  The stone church was used as both sanctuary and a repose from Indian attacks. It is listed in the Augusta County Historical Register.
Sinking Spring Presbyterian Church (Abingdon, Virginia), organized in 1772 and was founded by Rev. Charles Cummings
First Baptist Church (Petersburg, Virginia), contends as the oldest organized black Baptist congregation, organized 1774 (Baptist)
Kempsville Baptist Church (Virginia Beach, Virginia), Established with the Baptist Association on May 21, 1814
Old Chapel (Clarke County, Virginia) Oldest Episcopal church still in use west of the Blue Ridge Mountains; current building built 1790
St. John's Church (Richmond, Virginia), oldest wooden church building, built 1741
 Jerusalem Christian Church (1791), King William Virginia, oldest congregation affiliated with the Christian Churches and churches of Christ. It was once affiliated with the Disciples of Christ.
 Old Chapel Church also known locally as the "Snow Creek Chapel", was built in 1769 as a chapel of ease for the Church of England parish in what is today Penhook, Virginia. One of the oldest churches in the southwestern portion of the state.
 Independence United Methodist Church, (1783), Emporia Virginia. Originally was Independence Methodist church until many of the Methodist churches joined with the Evangelical United Brethren Church in 1968.

Washington
Claquato Church, the oldest church and the oldest standing building in Washington State. Built in 1857. Originally housed a Methodist Episcopal congregation.
Tumwater Methodist Church, 219 W. B Street in Tumwater, Washington. Built in 1872 and added to the National Register in 1984. Currently houses St. James Anglican Church.
St. Luke's Episcopal Church, oldest Episcopal congregation, continuously from 1860

Washington, D.C.
St. Paul's Episcopal Church, Rock Creek Parish (Washington, D.C.), oldest congregation and oldest church building, founded in 1717, current building constructed in 1775, but incorporating parts of the 1717 structure (Episcopal)

West Virginia

Rehoboth Church, built in 1785 (Methodist), oldest church building west of the main range of the Allegheny Mountains.
Tuscarora Presbyterian Church, oldest congregation and oldest church building, founded in 1740, central building constructed by 1745.

Wisconsin
Methodist Episcopal Church in Mineral Point, oldest Protestant congregation in Wisconsin, founded in 1834 (Methodist)
St. Gabriel's Church in Prairie Du Chien, oldest church building built in Wisconsin, built in 1835 (Roman Catholic)
St. Joan of Arc Chapel, oldest church building in Wisconsin, built in 15th century Chasse, France; moved to Milwaukee in 1965 (Roman Catholic).

Wyoming
First United Methodist Church (Cheyenne, Wyoming), possibly the oldest church congregation, founded in 1869 (Methodist)
Rock Church (Auburn, Wyoming), built in 1889, an LDS church is one the oldest church buildings in WY

See also
 Oldest buildings in the United States
 Oldest synagogues in the United States
 List of oldest buildings in the Americas
 List of the oldest churches in Mexico
 Oldest churches in the world

References

External links
 Archinform.net: International Architecture database

Oldest
Churches
Oldest churches
Oldest churches
Churches, United States, Oldest
Churches